Signetics Corporation was an American electronics manufacturer specifically established to make integrated circuits. Founded in 1961, they went on to develop a number of early microprocessors and support chips, as well as the widely used 555 timer chip. The company was bought by Philips in 1975 and incorporated in Philips Semiconductors (now NXP).

History

Signetics was started in 1961, by a group of engineers (David Allison, David James, Lionel Kattner, and Mark Weissenstern) who had left Fairchild Semiconductor. At the time, Fairchild was concentrating on its discrete component business (mostly transistors), and its management felt that by making integrated circuits (ICs) it would lose its customers. Signetics founders believed that ICs were the future of electronics (much like another contemporary Fairchild spinoff, Amelco) and wished to commercialize them. The name of the new company was coined from Signal Network Electronics.

The venture was financed by a group organized through Lehman Brothers, who invested $1M. The initial idea was to design and manufacture ICs for specific customers. In order to facilitate this goal, Signetics did not have a separate R&D lab; instead, the engineering was all done in technical development department, and was closely tied to marketing.

Signetics first developed a series of standard DTL ICs, which it announced in 1962. However, it was struggling to sell custom-made circuits, which was the original goal, and was quickly exhausting the initial investment money, so new investors had to be found. In November 1962, Corning Glass invested another $1.7M in Signetics, in exchange for 51% ownership. This money enabled Signetics to survive, and much of the funding was put into a marketing and sales campaign.

In 1963, the Department of Defense made a decision to begin a shift towards microelectronics and ICs, due to their small size, higher reliability, and lower power consumption. As a result, military contractors began to explore the field, and as Signetics was one of the few firms selling custom circuits, it benefited greatly. In the fall of 1963 and throughout most of 1964, sales grew quickly, and the company finally became profitable. Signetics also grew rapidly, hiring more engineers and increasing its manufacturing space. In 1964, Signetics opened a large new fabricating plant ("fab") in Sunnyvale, California. At this time, it was by far the largest manufacturer of ICs in Silicon Valley. It later expanded also to factories in Orem, Utah and Albuquerque, New Mexico, where there were two fabs, FAB22 (4-inch) and FAB23 (6-inch).

In 1964, Fairchild began to muscle its way into the IC business. Since Signetics circuits were the de facto standard in the market, Fairchild decided to copy them. However, it used its superior cash position, marketing power, and manufacturing strength to undercut its competitor by slashing prices and flooding the market. Signetics was struggling to compete, and began losing money again. Corning saw this as proof of poor management, and used its controlling interest to drive out most of the founders and take complete control of the company.

Signetics managed to stabilize and become profitable again, but it never regained its market leadership, which was now firmly held by Fairchild. Its engineers continued to innovate in IC technology, and remained a significant force. Around 1971, the Signetics introduced the innovative 555 timer IC, which it called "The IC Time Machine". This was the first and only low-cost commercial IC timer available at the time, and soon became a best-seller. Signetics was known for creating innovative ICs for both analog electronics and the rapidly-growing digital electronics applications.

In 1975, the company was acquired by Philips, who continued the brand for some years. In the United States, Signetics reached its manufacturing height at around 1980. Later it was fully integrated into Philips Semiconductors (now NXP).

In 1995, Philips spun off the assembly and test operation in South Korea, which was started by Signetics in 1966, as an independent subcontract service provider. They continue to use the name "Signetics". Since 2000, the Signetics brand is primarily used by the Young Poong Group.

Notable devices
Signetics introduced a number of innovative analog and digital integrated circuits which became de facto standard products widely used in mass-produced electronics. Freely-distributed application notes published by Signetics were key in educating students and practicing engineers in the usefulness and simplicity of their ICs. Some designs remain iconic and are still used today in basic electronics lab exercises. 
 The Signetics 555 timer IC was probably their best-known new product. Still widely manufactured and used today in original and updated versions, the basic design appears in many simple electronic timers, oscillators, and other basic electronic systems.
 The Signetics NE565 was an pioneering implementation of powerful phase-locked loop technology in an IC, which along with the voltage-controlled oscillator (VCO) NE566, helped advance digital communications.
 The Signetics 2650 was an 8-bit microprocessor introduced in the early 1970s and used in several video games and game systems (e.g. the Arcadia 2001). and in the early telesoftware broadcasts.
 The Signetics 8X300 was a bipolar microprocessor developed by Scientific Micro Systems but manufactured by Signetics starting in 1976. It was mostly used as a controller chip due to its limited instruction set and its high speed.
 The Signetics 2513 was a character generator chip used in the TV Typewriter, Apple I, and early versions of the Apple II, as well as Atari's earliest arcade games.
 The Signetics 82S100 FPLA (Field Programmable Logic Array) was the first commercially successful user programmable logic device, the forerunner of the modern FPGA.
 NE5532, a widely used audio op amp, now generic and produced by many other manufacturers. According to one 1993 article, NE5532 was "the standard audio op amp to which others are compared".
 NE5517, an operational transconductance amplifier, still in production by NXP Semiconductors and also generically made by other manufacturers; it is given as a classic OTA example in a number of textbooks.

See also
 Write-only memory (joke)

References

Further reading
 Lécuyer, C. Making Silicon Valley: Innovation and the Growth of High Tech, 1930-1970, MIT Press, 2006.

External links 
 Signetics.com: official Signetics website
 Chipdb.org: Signetics

Defunct semiconductor companies of the United States
Defunct computer companies of the United States
Defunct computer hardware companies
Assembly and Test semiconductor companies
Companies based in Silicon Valley
Technology companies based in the San Francisco Bay Area
American companies established in 1961
American companies disestablished in 1975
Computer companies established in 1961
Computer companies disestablished in 1975
Electronics companies established in 1961
Electronics companies disestablished in 1975
Technology companies established in 1961
Technology companies disestablished in 1975
1961 establishments in California
1975 disestablishments in California
Philips
Defunct companies based in the San Francisco Bay Area
1975 mergers and acquisitions
NXP Semiconductors